The National Master Freight Agreement is an occasionally updated master contract concerning employment of teamsters that has been signed by numerous labor unions and employers in the United States. Its original version was negotiated in the early 1960s by the International Brotherhood of Teamsters.

External links 
 2018-2023 National Master Freight Agreement

Agreements
International Brotherhood of Teamsters
Trade unions in the United States